Freestyle: The Art of Rhyme is a 2000 American documentary film directed by Kevin Fitzgerald. The film depicts the art of freestyle rap.

Plot
The history of freestyle rap is explored in the film, with a mix of performance and commentary from a number of artists. Using archive footage, the film traces the origins of improvised hip hop to sources including African-American preachers, Jamaican toasts, improvised jazz, and spoken-word poets.

Cast

Reception

Critical reception
On review aggregator website Rotten Tomatoes, the film holds an approval rating of 89% based on 18 reviews, and an average rating of 7.8/10. On Metacritic, the film has a weighted average score of 63 out of 100, based on 11 critics, indicating "generally favorable reviews".

A. O. Scott of The New York Times commented that "The skills on display in Freestyle are too varied and idiosyncratic for one movie to contain, but this one at least offers a heady, rousing education in an art form that is too often misunderstood." Nathan Rabin of The A.V. Club wrote, "With a running time just over an hour, Freestyle doesn't have the time or space to offer an exhaustive or definitive history of freestyling, but it exuberantly captures its spirit, and like any good rapper, it's savvy enough to leave audiences hungry for more." Fred Camper of Chicago Reader called it "[a]n engaged and knowing look at the underground world of improvised rap, concentrating on artists less interested in commercial success and cutting records than in the 'spontaneous right now' of 'nonconceptual rhyme.'"

In 2012, Complex placed the film at number 17 on the "25 Best Hip-Hop Documentaries" list.

Accolades

References

External links
 
 

2000 films
2000s hip hop films
American documentary films
Documentary films about hip hop music and musicians
2000s English-language films
2000s American films